Otar  Partskhaladze (b. 1976) — Prosecutor General of Georgia
 from November 2013 to December 2013. He resigned due to various prior convictions. Prior to 2008, he worked at the Ministry of Internal Affairs in various responsible positions, in addition to being a member of the Temporary Energy Commission of the Parliament of Georgia. Also, he was Head of Investigation Service, Ministry of Finance of Georgia. In November 2018 he was charged with beating the former head of the State Audit Office, Lasha Tordia, in May 2017, and granted 5,000 GEL bail. He has been involved in several other high-profile incidents. Several days before his resignation, Partskhaladze admitted to assaulting a police officer in 2010.

References

External links 
 Biography

Living people
1976 births
Politicians from Georgia (country)
Criminals from Georgia (country)
Politicians convicted of crimes